Just Across the River is the twelfth album by American singer-songwriter Jimmy Webb, released in June 2010 by Koch Records. The album features thirteen classic Jimmy Webb tunes performed by Webb with guest appearances by friends, collaborators, admirers, and fellow recording artists Linda Ronstadt, Jackson Browne, Billy Joel, Willie Nelson, Glen Campbell, Michael McDonald, Mark Knopfler, J.D. Souther, Vince Gill and Lucinda Williams.

Critical reception

In his review for AllMusic, Thom Jurek praised the efforts of producer Fred Mollin to assemble some of Nashville's finest musicians to produce a "gorgeous sound" that was mostly recorded live over two days in a Nashville studio. According to Jurek, some of the highlights include "Oklahoma Nights" with Vince Gill's "beautiful tenor balancing the harmonies"; "Highwayman" with Mark Knopfler's vocals underscoring Webb's vocals, "creating a dark, melancholy authenticity"; "Wichita Lineman" with Billy Joel's remarkable "empathic feel for the duet"; and "P.F. Sloan" with Jackson Browne's vocals making the song "a real tragedy for an era, as well as for a man."

In his review in Rolling Stone magazine, James Hunter awarded the album three and a half out of five stars, noting that "few singers blend grit and grandeur like Jimmy Webb" and that his voice "is like an old Mustang heading through a treacherous yet often gorgeous landscape."

Track listing

Personnel

Music
  Jimmy Webb – vocals, piano, composer, lyricist, liner notes
  Fred Mollin – synthesizer, harmonica, percussion, electric guitar, background vocals, guest appearance
  Mark Knopfler – electric guitar, guest appearance
  Johnny A – electric guitar, guest appearance
  Pat Buchanan – electric guitar
  Bryan Sutton – acoustic guitar, banjo, mandolin
  John Willis – acoustic guitar, banjo, electric guitar
  John Hobbs – organ, piano, wurlitzer
  Jim Hoke – accordion, steel guitar, penny whistle, jaw harp
  Jeff Taylor – accordion
  Jerry Douglas – dobro, guest appearance
  Paul Franklin – dobro, steel Guitar
  Stuart Duncan – fiddle, mandolin
  Larry Paxton – bass
  Eddie Bayers – drums
  Greg Morrow – drums
  Glen Campbell - guest appearance
  Jackson Browne – guest appearance
  Vince Gill – guest appearance
  Billy Joel – guest appearance
  Matthew McCauley – guest appearance
  Willie Nelson – guest appearance
  Linda Ronstadt – guest appearance
  J. D. Souther – guest appearance
  Russell Terrell – background vocals, guest appearance
  Tania Hancheroff – background vocals, guest appearance
  Jaime Babbitt – background vocals, guest appearance
  Troy Johnson – background vocals, guest appearance

Production
  Fred Mollin – producer
  Matthew McCauley – string arrangements, string conductor
  Kyle Lehning – engineer
  Mark Linett – engineer
  Kerry Cunningham – engineer
  Casey Wood – engineer
  Stephen Armstrong – engineer
  Jared Nugent – engineer
  Jake Burns – engineer
  David Stewart – engineer
  Jay Frigolleto – guitar engineer
  "Teenage" Dave Salley – overdub engineer
  Greg Calbi – mastering

References

2010 albums
E1 Music albums
Jimmy Webb albums